A Voluntary Product Accessibility Template (VPAT) is a template containing information regarding how an Information and communications technology product or service conforms with Section 508 of the Rehabilitation Act of 1973, as amended (29 U.S.C. § 794 (d)).  Section 508 provides guidelines for rendering ICT accessible to, and therefore usable by, people with disabilities. The VPAT was originally designed as a tool for vendors to document product compliance to Section 508 and facilitate government market research on ICT with accessible features. Many people started to call the completed document a "VPAT" but the wider procurement community would prefer to call it a product Accessibility Conformance Report, or ACR. The distinction is that the VPAT is the incomplete form, and the ACR is the completed report using the VPAT template.

The current VPAT has expanded to include the U.S. Revised Section 508, European EN 301 549, and WCAG standards which are required by regulations in many jurisdictions. It is available in four editions:
 WCAG edition - For reporting compliance to the W3C Web Content Accessibility Guidelines 2.0 or 2.1. 
 508 edition - For reporting compliance to the U.S. Revised Section 508 standards
 EU edition - The European edition used for reporting compliance to the EN 301 549 standard
 INT edition - The international edition used for reporting compliance to all three standards
 
The rows of each table in the VPAT address each accessibility requirement for ICT products. The rows are grouped into sections that match the organization of the particular standard. Standards typically have sections for different technology aspects of a product such as web content, software, documentation, hardware, two-way voice communications, and product support services. Each VPAT table has three columns. The first column identifies individual requirement, the second column is where the level of conformance to the requirement should be documented, and the third column is used for remarks and explanations further describing the level of conformance.

Legal status and history 
The template is a registered service mark of the Information Technology Industry Council (ITI).  This may affect its proper use in text, and who has permission to use the template.  The term is commonly used in procurement discussions of compliance or conformance with Section 508.

The VPAT was developed by ITI in partnership with the U.S. government's central procurement office, the General Services Administration, starting in 2001 to address the general issue of matching ICT product features to Section 508 accessibility requirements with a checklist. Characteristically a U.S. government office will require a VPAT to state the accessibility attributes of a product, but will not have enough time or information to examine the truthfulness of every line, and will not require perfect accessibility by all possible users. For example, a tool to be used only by few specialized software developers might be acquired even if its accessibility features are limited, whereas a widely used public web site will have to meet higher standards. The agency may make choices about what to require.

October 4, 2017, ITI published an updated version, VPAT 2.0, reflecting the provisions of the newly-published Revised Section 508. In addition, VPAT 2.0 incorporated provisions from the European ICT accessibility standards for public sector procurement, EN 301 549 V1.2.1, and the W3C WCAG 2.0 web content accessibility guidelines.

The VPAT has undergone multiple revisions to incorporate standards updates including a correction to the U.S. Revised Section 508 final rule, the W3C WCAG 2.1, and the EN 301 549 V2.1.2,. 

February 2020, ITI published the latest version, VPAT 2.4, which incorporated the provisions from the EN 301 549 V3.1.1,.

Example VPATs 
VPATs cover a wide array of products, including computer software, imaging hardware, web content, voice communications, electronic documentation and services.  ITI provides recommendations for completing VPATs but, ultimately, manufacturers and suppliers are responsible for the clarity, completeness, and usefulness of the content contained in the report.

 Stata statistical software VPAT
 Red Hat Network Satellite 5.1 VPAT (June 2008)
 Microsoft's Forefront™ Threat Management Gateway Web site VPAT
 Notebook computer VPAT for Lenovo ThinkPad

 GitHub web site VPAT
 Oracle keyboard VPAT
 Firefox software browser VPAT
 An example version 2.1 VPAT from Appian
 MediaWiki's VPAT

References

External links 

 Information Technology Industry Council (ITI)'s VPAT home page
 Section508.gov's VPAT page
 Introducing VPAT 2.0, The More Stringent Accessibility Reporting Tool Required For Federal Procurement

Computer accessibility
Government procurement in the United States
Accessible Procurement